Exner's Twin Bays or Exner Twin Bays is an organized hamlet within the Rural Municipality (RM) of Grayson No. 184 in the Canadian province of Saskatchewan.

Government 
While Exner's Twin Bays is under the jurisdiction of the RM of Grayson No. 184, it has a three-person hamlet board that is chaired by Darren Ulmer, whose four-year term will expire in 2023.

References

External links 

 

Grayson No. 184, Saskatchewan
Division No. 5, Saskatchewan
Organized hamlets in Saskatchewan